.fj is the country code top-level domain (ccTLD) for Fiji. Domain names can not be registered directly under .fj, but must be registered as a third level name. The .fj TLD was registered in 1992 and is currently administered by The University of the South Pacific IT Services.

Second-level domains 
Second-level domains that websites may be registered under include:

 ac.fj, reserved for academic (educational) institutions of any kind (excluding primary and secondary schools)
 biz.fj, no restrictions (intended for businesses)
 com.fj, no restrictions (intended for commercial entities)
 gov.fj, reserved for departments of the Government of Fiji
 info.fj, no restrictions (intended for informational websites)
 mil.fj, reserved for the Republic of Fiji Military Forces
 name.fj, no restrictions (intended for individuals)
 net.fj, no restrictions (intended for network providers/operators)
 org.fj, no restrictions (intended for organisations, especially nonprofits)
 pro.fj, no restrictions (intended for certified professionals)
 school.fj, reserved for primary and secondary schools

External links
 IANA .fj whois information
 .fj domain registration website
 The University of the South Pacific – Information Technology Services

References 

Country code top-level domains
Communications in Fiji

sv:Toppdomän#F